Dagik, also Dengebu, Dagig, Thakik, Buram, Reikha, is a Niger–Congo language in the Talodi family spoken in the Nuba Mountains in Kordofan, Sudan. It is 80% lexically similar with Ngile, which is also spoken by the Mesakin people.

It is spoken in Buram, Kamlela, Reikha, Taballa, and Tosari villages.

The most comprehensive grammar is that of Vanderelst (2016).

Phonology

Consonants 

 Sounds /p, t̪, t, k/ can have intervocalic allophones as sonorants [β, ð, ɾ, ɣ], and voiced allophones [b, d̪, d, ɡ] when after nasals.
 Sounds [f, h] only have marginal status.
 /r/ can also be heard as a tap [ɾ] allophone.

Vowels 

 /u/ can also assimilate to a close-mid [o] in different environments.

References

Talodi languages